Traktovy is a rural locality (a settlement) in Dobryansky District, Perm Krai, Russia. The population was 25 as of 2010. There are 6 streets.

References 

Rural localities in Dobryansky District